Sphinx Valley is a shallow hanging valley, 1 nautical mile (1.9 km) long, running northwest parallel to Columnar Valley and terminating just west of the summit of Table Mountain, at the northwest side of Royal Society Range, Victoria Land in eastern Antarctica.

It was named from the distinctive rock formations along its northwest wall, one of which resembles the Great Sphinx of Giza. It was named by Alan Sherwood, New Zealand Geological Survey party leader in the area, 1987–88.

Valleys of Victoria Land
Scott Coast
Great Sphinx of Giza